A general election was held in the United Kingdom on 15 November 1922. Of the 74 seats representing Scotland, 71 seats represented burgh and county constituencies contested under the First past the post electoral system, and 3 represented the Combined Scottish Universities multi-member University constituency.

The election saw major gains for the Labour party, which had entered the election as Scotlands' 6th largest party, and emerged from the election as the largest party in Scotland. In contrast both the Conservatives (represented in Scotland by the Unionist party) and the National Liberals suffered heavy losses. These two parties had composed the ruling coalition government under David Lloyd George, which had collapsed following the Conservatives withdrawal from the coalition amidst several scandals. Most of the elected Labour MP's had included support for Scottish Home Rule in their manifestos. Part of the reason for Labour's success came from a shift in the political alignment of Scottish Catholics of Irish descent, who had prior to Irish independence voted Liberal due to the partys' support for Irish Home Rule. Despite this, the two Liberal parties received between them 39.2% of the Scottish vote.

Of the party leaders, two represented Scottish constituencies, with Bonar Law representing Glasgow Central and Asquith representing Paisley.

Two minor parties were also able to pick up seats with the Communist party gaining Motherwell and the Scottish Prohibition Party gaining a seat in Dundee (and in the process ejecting Winston Churchill from Parliament.

Results

Burgh & County constituencies

University constituencies

Votes summary

References

1922 in Scotland
1920s elections in Scotland
1922
Scotland